Pascale Pouzadoux (born 19 April 1970) is a French film director, screenwriter and actress.

Life and career
Pouzadoux was trained at the Théâtre national de Chaillot. She performed in the adaptation of Victor Hugo's L'Intervention, a play staged by Jacqueline Huppert in 1977, before going on to appear in a number of television series and films.

In 2003, she made her feature film directorial debut Toutes les filles sont folles, starring Antoine Duléry, with whom she had two sons, Raphaël and Lucien.

Filmography

References

External links
 

1970 births
Living people
French film directors
French women film directors
French women screenwriters
French screenwriters
French film actresses
French television actresses
20th-century French actresses
21st-century French actresses
People from Saint-Mandé